Carolinians are a Micronesian ethnic group who originated in Oceania, in the Caroline Islands, with a total population of over 8,500 people. They are also known as Remathau in the Yap's outer islands. The Carolinian word means "People of the Deep Sea." It is thought that their ancestors may have originally immigrated from Asia and Indonesia to Micronesia around 2,000 years ago. Their primary language is Carolinian, called Refaluwasch by native speakers, which has a total of about 5,700 speakers. The Carolinians have a matriarchal society in which respect is a very important factor in their daily lives, especially toward the matriarchs. Most Carolinians are of the Roman Catholic faith.

The immigration of Carolinians to Saipan began in the early 19th century, after most of the local Chamorro population had died, reducing them to just 3,700. They began immigrating by sailing mostly from small canoes via islands which were previously devastated by a typhoon. The Carolinians have a much darker complexion than the native Chamorros.

Genetics
Carolinians from Saipan have the same lineages with Remathau on the outer islands of Yap.

Some of the people on the islands are Chamolinians, who are a mixture of Chamorro and Carolinian heritage.

The Carolinians in the CNMI have a high rate of macrosomia which is where the infant is born abnormally large.

Names
Another name for Carolinians that isn't used that much is Repaghuluwósch. Another name that they called themselves in their own language was Falawasch in the 1800s. They may have used this name beyond this century.

Personal and Surname Name Usage 
Saralu is a Carolinian name. This name was used by a man named Clemente Saralu Taisacan who was a Carolinian fisherman of Rota. This was the maiden name of his Carolinian mother.

In the 1950s and going back to Spanish era in certain cases used Spanish names. During this time and before it the people had three names. This may still be the case today in the 2020s. They had a Spanish Christian name for the individual. The parents decide what name to give them. The second name will be Carolinian. The parents or another relative that's older will decide this name. The third name will be surname also Carolinian.

Children are given the surnames of their fathers as of the 1950s but this wasn't always the case. Soon before this children will get either the mother's or father's surname. Brothers usually have different family names.

Some men have nicknames, often a joking name that friends use.

German personal and last names are possibly used in this community due to German colonial era in the Northern Marianas.

On the islands of Saipan and Tinian there are Carolinian or Chamorro families with Japanese surnames. There are several of these families with these names.

History

Pre-Spanish era (antiquity-1697)

They have a history stretching back over 3000 years. The Carolinian people had contact with the Chamorro people for years. They had a long history of traveling from the Caroline Islands to what is now Guam. "Pre-contact" Carolinian designed pestles, hooks for fishing, and rings made out of shells found on the ground and beneath it show contact between the two groups.

They built canoes that would have a small roof. The roof only went over less than half of the canoe. The sides could be different colors. The boat could fit over 9 adults in it.

Centuries ago they used sea-lanes based on memorized information from the prior generation.

Before colonial times a system called  was practiced. The word  means Yapese chief, conqueror, tyrant. This involved the Carolinians gathering once every two or three years in Yap. This system may have existed before the year 1600. More on this is discussed in the religion section.

Trade between the two groups went on even during the Spanish occupation of Guam.

Typhoon devastation and Spanish era (1697–1899)
In the late 1600s leprosy was present in the Marianas. The Spaniards tried to deal with this by quarantining lepers to Saipan and Tinian. These islands were isolated. Spaniards brought Carolinians to these islands to help the hospitals holding the patients with leprosy.

Chamorro sargento mayor Luís de Torres became an important source for people who wanted information about the Carolinian people.

During this time the people built a boat called Waa (canoe). This is a boat built for the sea. They were for transporting cargo and passengers over long distances.

Reports of Spanish-Chamorro wars via Chamorro refugees discouraged Carolinians from traveling to the Mariana Islands. These wars were going on during the 1600s. They didn't travel there until Carolinian navigator Luito came to Guam in 1778.

Carolinian sailors became very knowledgeable of the Marianas islands and learned that the northern islands were mostly empty of people.

In Guam, Carolinians came to Talofofo Bay in 1788. They were on a voyage. The reason why they stopped there was because they wanted iron. This kind of trade hadn't occurred in over a hundred years in Guam since the military conflicts between Spanish and Chamorros. Guam became popular with Carolinians not only because of the iron but also because of copper and other resources.

In the 19th century the Refaluwasch moved from Elato and Satawal islands in the East and West part of the Carolinian islands to what is now Northern Mariana Islands.

Before this event a religious order already in place in the Mariana Islands. During the 18th century a Catholic order called the Augustinian Recollects was given missionary work in the Mariana Islands. Later in the 19th century they attended to Carolinian migrants who came to these islands.   

The two islands were destroyed by typhoon. Refaluwasch were starving during this time. Chief Nguschul (pronounced NGU-SHOO-L) of Elato along with Chief Aghurubw (Pronounced A-GA-RU-B) of Satawal led the people to the NMI. The people traveled in 120 canoes. The boats were filled with an estimated 900 people. They landed at Micro Beach. They setup the first Carolinian settlement on what is now CNMI in 1815. After coming to Saipan they built a village called Arabwal. They tried to live like they did on the islands they left. They also kept up yearly links with their home islands. Right now this area is in American Memorial Park. This was not the only village built. The other one Ppiyal Oolang. This area is where Nguschul and his group settled. The villages' sites were chosen because of the sandy beaches and swamp like sites. The sites also enabled made it easy for them to access the ocean through reef passages. They were also chosen because it was fronted by a long sheltered lagoon. The swampy areas east of the beach was useful for taro cultivation. The people wanted to  remake the best things of their lives back at their home islands. A group of Carolinians came from Lamotrek and another came from Tametam not long after and joined them. These were not the only Carolinians that continued to come to Marianas. More continued to come here in the 100s as well as other areas such as Guam and Tinian.   

The Spanish allowed them to keep their culture.

During the mid-1800s Carolinians moved to Tamuning due to an 1849 typhoon which devastated their land.

During this time they took over inter-island travel during the latter half of the 18th century and 19th century. They used a ship called banca to travel.

In 1865 265 Carolinians were transferred from the Carolines by Englishman George Johnston. He moved them to Pagan.

In 1868 a powerful typhoon hit Arabwal causing massive damage. However, due to the high island resources the community and village were able to recover from it.

The Tanapag village was set up by some Refaluwasch who left Tinian island in 1879.

By 1885 most of the desirable lands in the Northern Marianas were now under the control of the Carolinians.

Ten years later in 1889 Governor Olive had the Refaluwasch on Tinian relocate to Tanapag.

German period (1899–1914)
Spain sold the Northern Mariana Islands to Germany in 1899, after losing Guam to the United States in 1898. This area became known as the German Northern Marianas. This was the shortest period a country controlled this area. They didn't change the culture of the Carolinians a lot but did bring in new ways of schooling, bureaucracy, architecture, and administration. The legal system was transparent towards both Carolinians and Chamorros.

Georg Fritz on 17 November 1899 became the first district officer of this area. He set up programs which brought the Carolinians and Chamorro people living on the islands together. In 1902 on the volcanic island Anatahan evidence of Carolinian huts were found by him. These were used Carolinian workers who until recently harvested copra.

Marriages between German settlers or colonial officers and Carolinians at Saipan occurred. The marriage did not allow for citizenship for either the Carolinian partner or children. This was the same for Chamorro people.

Carolinians were peaceful towards the Germans.

The population measurement in 1901 for these individuals are 772. The last population count the Germans did in 1914 recorded 1,109 of them.

Carolinians didn't own land during this time unlike the Chamorros living here.

US naval era (1899-1903)

In Guam the people were made to adopt Western ways because of the U.S. Naval Administration.

One example of this was banning nudity. In Guam the first American governor was Richard P. Leary (1899–1900). He issued an order where Carolinian women in Guam weren't allowed to be naked when ever he visited. This was done away with by Governor William E. Sewell (1903–1904). The men were not allowed to be naked either. Many went to Saipan to avoid doing this. The constant nudity of the people bothered the second American governor Seaton Schroeder (1900–1903) so much that he decided to move them off the island. They were sent to CNMI through an agreement with the Germans who controlled those islands. They wanted additional laborers.

Japanese administration and occupation (1914–1945)
Japan took over the Mariana Islands in 1914. They were able to keep it due to the Treaty of Versailles.

The Carolinians had villages which the Japanese called . A  is a general village chieftain. A  is a village chieftain. These chieftains didn't always have position under the traditional tribal patterns.

While the Japanese controlled these islands they used these people as laborers for mining and handling phosphate ore. One of the mines was in Angaur under the Palau group. In the economic system under Japan in Saipan Chamorros fared better than Carolinians. Carolinians were not treated as well as the Chamorros who worked with them. The Japanese and other colonial powers during this time (WWI-WWII) would not allow Carolinians to do canoe navigation over large distances. During this time a term was used to refer to the Micronesian people under Japanese control which was 'Tomin.' Tomin meant inhabitants of the land. The Carolinian and Chamorro people viewed this as a put down since Japanese used it as part of the discrimination. The Japanese government or South Seas Government viewed them as uncivilized and primitive. The people were kept under strict surveillance. They were enslaved in 1944. During this time few in this indigenous community served as scouts for the U.S. military. They served in the U.S. Marines.

On Saipan some Refaluwasch families were under an American military government. Some of them were in Camp Susupe. They were in a Chamorro-Carolinian area of the Camp. Some Refaluwasch were restricted from returning to their lands during this occupation. One of the reasons why they were interned was because the United States government wanted them to learn English as well as American political and social life. They were allowed to farm and fish before the evening. They had to return to the Camp when night came.

During the battle of Saipan in 1944 Carolinians set up underground bunkers to protect themselves and families from Japanese soldiers and Americans Marines. They buttressed these bunkers with coconut logs which would not be notice by the Japanese and Americans.

On Saipan during April 1945 there were 810 Refaluwasch on the island. Later in September of that more people of that group were brought into Saipan.

After the Japanese surrender Refaluwasch were allowed to return to their lands.

Post-World War II (1945–2000)
The people didn't object to the edicts of the U.S. military authorities. They were thankful for the basic necessities provided by Naval Military Government. The authorities founded a police force consisting of Carolinians and Chamorros for Camp Susupe and Chalan Kanoa. It was called Native Police and was 87 strong.

Under the Naval Military Government Carolinian families in certain cases adopted orphans of Korean or Japanese descent. They were orphaned because of WWII.

Efforts to Reunify the Marianas & Service 
After World War II there have been efforts to reunify the Marianas. In 1961 the Carolinian community submitted a resolution opposing reunification of all the Marianas. In 1969 community was interested in a freely associated state concerning the Northern Marianas Islands. The Northern Marianas Carolinians desired stronger connections with Carolinians in Micronesia.

They have served in the Vietnam War. Only less than a 100 are known.

Early 21st Century 
Before 2004 the Carolinians and Chamorro people were competing with each other before banding together. This is sometimes called Chamolinian. They did this to challenge what they call outsiders. Outsiders involve Filipinos and Japanese among other groups of immigrants and/or migrants.

As of 2018 Refaluwasch in the Marianas have one of the highest rates of service in the U.S. military.

In 2018 former Acting Governor of Northern Mariana Islands Victor Hocog signed a proclamation to make September Chamorro and Carolinian Heritage Month. In the month you have special day called Chief Aghurubw Day.

Resistance to U.S. militarization
Despite the fact there are high rates of service for the military in this community there has been resistance to buildup. Refaluwasch women are using different ways to resist military buildup in the Marianas Archipelago. They have used digital, legal, political, and spiritual methods to resist this. They are using lawsuits supported by the National Environmental Policy Act (NEPA). They are using this against the Department of Defense (DoD) and Department of the Navy.

Population
On Saipan in 1869 the population was 331.

In 1911 on Saipan the population is 1211, on Pagan their population was 95, and Agrigan their population was 18.

In 1946 on Saipan the population was 1,047. There were 355 adult males, 307 adult females, 209 male children, and 176 female children. 

According to a Native Census for Quarter Ending 31 March 1948 there were 1072 on Saipan. There were 253 males under 16, 304 males under 16, 224 females under 16, and 291 females over 16.

On Guam in 1953 there was less than a 150 Carolinians.

The population in 1999 on the CNMI was 3,500.

Carolinians due to Compact of Free Association have increased greatly on Guam. As of the 2000 U.S. census the population is around 11,000.

The Chamorros and Carolinians make up less than half of the people on CNMI. They are 4.6% of the population on CNMI. According to the 2010 American FactFinder profile on CNMI the Carolinians number over 2,400. In Saipan they are 20% of the population. The population in the United States has increased a lot. Outside the CNMI and Guam in the United States Washington State has the biggest population of them. The population in the state is 127. In Seattle there is 116 of them. Concerning age 40% of the people in this group are less than 18 while only 2% of this group are over 65.

They make up 2% of the population in Palau. According to the 2015 census on Palau there are 361.

Economics
During the late 1990s it was estimated they had 20 percent unemployment. Also during this time they were behind the Chamorros in terms of economics. The Chamorro people were more economical development than they were. This has been going on for a long time in their community. They were susceptible to progress' bad effects.

In 2005 on the island of Saipan 2% of employed workers were Carolinians.

According to the 2010 U.S. Census the people along with other Micronesian groups have lower home owner ship than the many other ethnic groups in the country. They are mainly renters. Only 14% of them are homeowners while the rest are renters.

Politics

There has been efforts to bring the Marianas together. In the 1960s people submitted a resolution against putting the Marianas under one government. The Carolinians in the Northern Marianas desired stronger ties with Refaluwasch abroad in Micronesia. A lot of them wanted CNMI to be freely associated with the U. S.

The population is represented in the legislature however the Chamorro people are dominant in politics.

Elias Parung Sablan became Mayor of Saipan in 1945.

Benigno R. Fitial (1945– ) became the CNMI's first governor of Carolinian descent.

Lieutenant Governor Timothy P. Villagomez served under Fitial.

Cinta Kaipat served in CNMI House of Representatives in the 15th CNMI Legislature.

Joseph James Norita Camacho was a member of 16th CNMI House of Representatives and held the position as House Floor Leader. He was elected to this position in 2007.

In the Obama Administration a Refaluwasch women named Rellani Bennett Ogumoro served as the Policy Advisor for the Domestic Policy Council. Before this she was named 2011 Truman Scholar. She received the Eastern Oregon University (EOU) Student Award.

Culture

Their culture originated from the islands Yap and Chuuk in what is now the Federated States of Micronesia. The present day generation as of 2010 has less respect for the culture in addition to the chiefs who push them. The culture has been influenced by others who reside in CNMI.

Cultural facts
The Managaha Island is sacred in Refaluwasch culture due to the fact Chief Aghurubw is buried there.

Much like the Chamorro people, respect is very important to their culture. They also historically place an emphasis on solidarity, or tipiyeew.

The Refaluwasch have respect for elders of any economic background and education level.

Mwei-mwei is a Refaluwasch way of adopting children which is usually initiated and done between familial wives. The children adopted are usually babies but can be as old as eleven. The natural parents must give permission. After permission is given and the child is adopted, the adoptive parents treat the child(ren) like a natural child in all situations.

Dance
The people have two different dances. For the men, it's called "Maas". They also do a Stick dance. For the women, it's called "Bwaay", a slow dance. In certain men's dances, they wear large leaves around their necks (ubwuut) and a traditional bead called "Lighatuttur" or "Usos". They also wear coconut leaves fashioned into a crown. The dance was originally for warriors but spread to other men after the people came to the Mariana Islands.

Traditional dress, art, and body art

Dress
The Carolinian people had to give up native dress for more modest Western clothing.

Women in different cases would wear a long skirt up to the bottom of their breasts. 

There is a wreath that's still worn call a mwar-mwar. Its still worn by many of them.

Body art
The female and males have their own tattoos. The females have tattoos are their calves, while the males have tattoos on their lower thighs as well as their upper thighs, buttocks, arms, back of neck, and lower back.

Art
They painted symbols on their sails.

Death
When a person dies, the body is covered with sweet-smelling flowers and vines. The body is rolled up into pandanus mat. At the right time women place the body on the water and move it to the edge of a particular reef. They put weights with the dead person in the current which takes the body out to the ocean.

In their culture places called Fiirourow are used to deal with people who died. These are ancestral villages and places where the Refaluwasch go to burn the belongings of loved ones. The places are located in the reefs.

After death and spirits 
As of the 1950s it is considered disrespectful to say a deceased person's name in front of relatives of the deceased. This may still be the case today in the 21st century.

Sometimes the body is burned and the ashes are 'returned' to the ocean. In other cases the skull is put in a sacred place. This is done for a spiritual reason.

In their history up to the 1950s there was a strong belief in ghosts. There still may be a strong belief now in ghosts. There are two kinds. One is called alü luwal and the other is called alü leim. The alü luwal were thought to possibly be ghosts of the ancients. The alü luwal are the ghosts of the people that died recently usual and those known to be deceased. These spirits can cause harm to the living. During this time at least most of them knew of ideas concerning magic that deals with the harm these spirits bring. This harm is illnesses.

The damage these spirits can inflict are limited by medicine men. Magic they believed was used to deal with treating disease.

Water
The water around the Northern Mariana Islands has been integral to these people. They have respect and connection to the sea. In the culture men would go out and get food while women would prepare. The women would scale clean and scale fish. 
They have celestial navigation skills. Part of this was a triangulation method called etak (moving islands). They share with the Native Hawaiians and Chamorro people a common ancient origin and seafaring navigation achievements.

Carolinian customary law
Under this law property can be owned by one person or a whole family. The CNMI Code says family land should be held for the equal enjoyment of all members.

Traditional Carolinian land tenure involve women. Land was passed down from mother to daughter. The land was owned and controlled by women. The oldest female in the maternal line with the longest held title would be a "trustee" for the rest of the lineage members.

In 2005 Commonwealth Code said family land can be got at least one Carolinian ancestor.

Food
Subsistence agriculture to get food was how these people lived from 1815 to 1914 in the CNMI.

In 1840 visitors saw the people on Saipan living off fish, turtles, taro, and yam.

Seafood makes up a big part of their meat dishes. They have a history of fishing that goes over thousands of years. Fishing trips are not just for feeding a small group of people but also for annual village parties, baptisms and confirmations, marriages, and other special celebrations. After fish are caught some of it may be given to the wife of the fisherman's family members as well as others.

In the past palu (navigators) brought food from the sea. They were respected.

Payúr is a fish that is caught using a poiu (fishing stone). Payúr is Refaluwasch for mackerel scad. Poiu consists of a limestone spherical sinker. Its smoothed into the shape of an egg. Holes are put into it. After this an inverted half coconut shell that's either the same size or a little smaller is connected with a cordage. Half of the coconut is filled with mashed or ground meat from a young coconut. This is similar to churn. This is to draw fish to it. This whole device is tied using a longer cord that's 50 or 60 feet in length. The cord is very long so that the poiu can be lowered into deeper water to feed fish. The poiu is set down on the sea bed before being moved closer to above the water over the course of a month. The Payúr are eventually gathered using a scoop net after getting to the surface.

Language

The Carolinian language is a Chuukic language. The language has different versions. Carolinian is one of the official languages in the CNMI.

Written records of this language go back to the late 1700s.

The language is spoken widely on Northern Marianas Islands among Carolinians.

Religion

Traditional religion(s)
Despite the Catholic faith many of them use land to talk to their ancestors. Land in their culture is not just "property". It's a spiritual matter. The place is where people can talk to their ancestors as well as collect unique properties for healing and teach traditions to future generations.

In their religion or religions they had i animas. Spiritual ancestors of the CNMI.

The ocean to these people is not just important to them its spiritual. According to some of them its spiritually central to Carolinian Indigeneity.

Before the Spanish brought Catholicism there was a religion where a Supreme being called Yalafar was worshiped. There is also in this same religion an individual called Can who is a bad spirit.

After an individual dies in certain cases their skull is kept because some believe the spirit of the late relative can visit their family when necessary. The living have great respect for the dead. In their culture concerning their traditional religion(s) spirits of the dead can assist or hurt the living. It is also believed that since the spirit world is the source of all things in this world everything that lives or is real must be respected. They contain spirits which go by different names such as ghosts, taotaomo'na, white ladies, among other names.

As mentioned earlier they had a system called . They would bring materials (offerings) to their "fathers" in exchange for "spiritual protection." One of the other reasons why people brought offerings was because of Yapese magicians. They were believed to have power over the weather.

The stick dance has a religious origin in Chuuk. It is claimed that a spirit taught this centuries ago during a war between two clans. The dance started off as a way of fighting.

Roman Catholicism

Roman Catholicism dominates in their societies. Due to Spanish missionary influence, they also use rosaries and novenas.

Efforts to bring Christianity to these people began with Father Paul Klein during the 1600s. One of the people to bring Catholicism to them was Father Juan Antonio Cantova in the early 1700s.

In 1819, a group of Carolinians was told to accept Christianity before moving to Saipan. The agreement (which included other things) was authorized by officials in Manila.

Family, gender, and health

Family
Under German administration de facto marriages happened between German settlers or colonial officers and Carolinians on Saipan. These marriages didn't involve marriage certificates. They were "Micronesian marriages." These didn't lead to citizenship for the Carolinians or the children coming out of the marriage.

Carolinian families under the Naval Military Government adopted Japanese and Korean war orphans.

The usual Western family setup has been used by Carolinians but in lots of communities still have their matrilineal social setup.

In 1999 domestic violence was said to be widespread. Females are expected to treat male relatives with respect when they are present.

In their language there is a term called nemin. This endearment term is what the men use when referring to their partners.

Gender
In this culture there are rigid gender divisions.

When a male relative is in the same room a female may make herself lower than him. They may even get down on their hands and knees and crawl to where they have to go.

Utt (pronounced "oot") is a meeting house where men congregate. They would also construct canoes in these places. In Garapan there is Carolinian Utt where you can play different sports. Its also used as a community center.

Health
The Managaha Island is not only a sacred place but it has been used to get medicinal plants.

According to the Asia Pacific Journal Public Health diabetes was more common among Carolinians in the 1990s.

In the community in 1999 they were dealing with drug abuse, alcoholism, and obesity. The main drug was crystal methamphetamine. This drug was introduce to CNMI in 1989. The drug in the 90s was quickly destroying the family values of Carolinians.

The people are at an extremely high risk of getting two kinds of cancer. The two kinds are cervical and breast cancer. According to the Division of Public Health for recording Cervical cancer in 2005 the population for 25–34-year-old group 88.9 out of 100,000 gets this cancer. In the 35–44 group it is 49.4 out of every 100,000 for this disease. In the 45–54 its 40 per 100,000.

An article in Preventing Chronic Disease talked about births among Pacific Islanders in the CNMI. In the CNMI Carolinian mothers have a much higher risk of having a premature births than Chinese mothers. They are also more likely to have babies with macrosomia than Filipino moms. Out of all births from 2007 to 2014 this group is having the most children at 33.2%. Concerning teenage pregnancy its more common among them and other Pacific Islanders than other groups. In the mid-2000s to 2009 there was an increase from 7 to 12 at first than  a decrease before an bigger increase to 18 in 2009. They also have major issues with obesity and cholesterol. Diabetes is still an issue in their community. CNMI Pacific Islanders more so than other groups are engaging in unhealthy actions such as using tobacco, chewing betel nut, and consuming alcohol. The chewing of betel nut is contributing to preterm birth rates among this.

Media representation
The Refaluwasch have little to no presence in films. Most films have white people in speaking roles. Pacific Islanders in Hollywood according to report from USC only make a fraction of the actors and actresses in film in recent years.

They also have little to no presence in television. Pacific Islanders makeup a fraction of the characters on prime time. They make up just 0.2% of acting roles in which the character appears regularly. More than 64% of series as of 2017 did not feature a Pacific Islander or Asian American regularly. Their white counterparts will usually get three times the screen time they get in the same program.

Comic strips in the early 20th century and 19th century had little to no female Refaluwasch whether they be cartoonists or minor characters.

Notable people

Luito also known as Luwito (????-disappeared in 1789) was a Carolinian navigator of Lamotrek. He was able to reach Guam using chants that contain the directions to the island. Guam was known as "Waghal" on Lamotrek and other areas. On his return from the second voyage to Guam his group separated into two before a storm destroyed their voyage in 1789.

Chief Aghurubw (1700s-1800s) of the Ghatoliyool clan and chief of Satawal brought the Refaluwasch in Satawal to CNMI in 1815.

Chief Nguschul (1700s-1800s) of Elato (a coral reef atoll consisting of three islands) brought his group to what is now CNMI in 1815 and named a village Ppiyal Oolang which in English means "beach view sky." Oral tradition may imply that he lived into old age before dying on Elato.

Kadu (late 1700s-1800s) was a Woleaian navigator and Chief under King Toua. He was an emissary traveling on sea under his King until 1814. He and his associates were blown of course to the Marshalls. He was a castaway discover in the Marshalls in 1815 by a Captain named Otto von Kotzebue. He gave Kotzebue information on the Caroline Islands.

King Toua (1700s-1800s) was chief of the Yap Outer Island Woleai atoll. He became king in the year 1800 according to Captain Kotzebue of the Kotzebue voyage. He came to Guam to get iron through trade in the very early 1800s. In 1851 he sought to advance himself using people in the Northern Islands.

Former Mayor Elias Parong Sablan (1900–1968) was a chief and mayor in the Northern Marianas  Islands. He became second mayor of Saipan in 1945 and served 3 four-year terms until 1957. He was also Judge of Saipan's Community Court, Chairman of Saipan's Board of Education, Chief of Police, and member of Congress (Saipan's). The man also owned a grocery store.

Benusto Rogolifoi Kaipat (born 1930 or 1931 - died 1991) also known as Dr. Kaipat was a Carolinian leader and the first Carolinian doctor. He cofounded the Territorial Party in 1957. He was the first cousin of Herman Rogolifoi Guerrero who was a politician on the CNMI. He was part of a clan called Rogolifoi.

David Mangarero Sablan aka Uncle Dave (1932-) is a prominent business leader on the CNMI. His father was Elias Parong Sablan. He was born on Garapan Saipan. He started his business career in 1952 with Atkins, Kroll & Company. He worked for nearly 40 years in business before retiring in 1987 from a position in company named Microl. He was not only a businessman but involved in politics. He was involved in different ways such as economic advisor for former CNMI Governor Tenorio and was active in the 1981 election for CNMI governor among other activities in politics.

Mau Piailug (1932–2010) was a master navigator involve in using non-instrument wayfinding.

Felix F. Rabauliman (1934-1996) He was a part of Marianas Political Status Commission. He was also part of the Saipan municipal government. In the 1960s he was a teacher teaching grades 1st to 6th. His clan is called Mongofasch. The name of his wife's clan is Umma.

Jose R(ebuenog) Lifoifoi Sr. (1936-2020) was a politician in the CNMI government serving in the Legislature. Before this he work in the Trust Territory government. He started in 1962 in the office of Procurement and Supply. In the Legislature he was the fifth Speaker of the House of Representatives. He was also the Chairman of the United Micronesia Development Association and Chairman of the Commonwealth Ports Authority Board of Directors. He even had a job as the Republic of Palau's Honorary Consul to the Northern Marianas Islands.

Larry Saralu was one of the most famous singers in the early Post World War II years. He was Saipanese Carolinian.

Lino (Urushemeyoung) Mettao Olopai (1940–) was responsible for maintaining the Carolinian culture.

Benigno Repeki Fitial (1945–) became the first Carolinian governor of CNMI in 2006 and served until 2013. During this time he was a member of the U. S. Republican Party.

Candy Taman (1948–) is a Chamorro-Carolinian recording artist who made Chamorro and Carolinian music. He formed a band called Local Breed with Frank "Bokonggo" Pangelinan. He would later rename it Tropocisette. He pioneered Chamorro music on CNMI.

Felicidad Taman Ogumoro (1949-) was a member of the First Commonwealth Legislature and cofounder of Western Pacific Associates. She was one of the first two women in the Northern Marianas Commonwealth Legislature. In Micronesian culture she has change the idea of traditional roles for males and females. She also became vice speaker of House of Representatives on the CNMI.

Jacinta (Libwaischibw) "Cinta" Matagolai Kaipat (August 1961-) was the first Refaluwasch woman to become a lawyer. The Northern Islands' Agrighan Island was where she was born.

Felipe I. Ruak (1961 or 1962-) an artistic director of a stick dancing group called the Talabwog Man Stick Dancers. This is traditional Refaluwasch group in Saipan. His son Joseph K. Ruak is an artistic director of the same group. He is from the Tanapag Village.

Joseph James Norita Camacho became the first Carolinian judge in CNMI. He became a judge in 2011.

Oston Saralu is a Chamorro/Carolinian/Palauan American singer.

Sarilyn Ogumoro Escobar became the first Carolinian to be a commissioned officer in US Navy.

References

External links
 Allen, Stewart D. & Amesbury, Judith R. Commonwealth of the Northern Mariana Islands As a Fishing Community. NOAA.  2012, https://www.pifsc.noaa.gov/library/pubs/tech/NOAA_Tech_Memo_PIFSC_36.pdf
Bagnol, Raquel C. Managaha's cultural heritage. Marianas Variety. 2013, http://www.mvariety.com/index.php/special-features/my-marianas/56422-managaha-s-cultural-heritage
Carrell, Toni L. Micronesia Submerged Cultural Resources Assessment. NPS. 1991,  https://www.nps.gov/orgs/1635/upload/NNPS_903_D161_-37387.pdf
Collier, R. Navigating Modernity / The Carolinians, a tiny group of islanders on Saipan, in the western Pacific, have seen their ancient culture succumb to consumerism. As they try to salvage what they can of their past, they are helping to lead a cultural revival am. SF Gate.1999, https://www.sfgate.com/news/article/Navigating-Modernity-The-Carolinians-a-tiny-3774200.php
"Commonwealth of the Northern Mariana Islands." Department of the Interior, https://www.doi.gov/oia/islands/cnmi Accessed 3 April 2019.
James Ellis, S. Saipan Carolinian, One Chuukic Language Blended From Many. University Of Hawaii. 2012, http://www.ling.hawaii.edu/graduate/Dissertations/JimEllisFinal.pdf
Encinares, Erwin. Tudela: Indigenous Affairs Expo a success. Saipan Tribune. 2018, https://www.saipantribune.com/index.php/tudela-indigenous-affairs-expo-a-success/
Frain, Sylvia C. 'Make America Secure'. Pacific Media Centre. 2018, https://ojs.aut.ac.nz/pacific-journalism-review/article/download/407/629/
Lirio, Lori Lyn C. 2nd Indigenous Cultural Expo bigger than last year's. Marianas Variety. 2018, http://www.mvariety.com/cnmi/cnmi-news/local/108113-2nd-indigenous-cultural-expo-bigger-than-last-year-s
Manabat, B. Flame Tree Arts Festival honors 11 artists, cultural advocates. Marianas Variety. 2016, http://www.mvariety.com/cnmi/cnmi-news/local/85452-flame-tree-arts-festival-honors-11-artists-cultural-advocates
Severance, Craig. Customary Exchange Maintains Cultural Continuity. Pacific Islands Fishery News. 2010, https://www.wpcouncil.org/outreach/newsletters/PIFN_summer2010.pdf
CNMI Supreme Court. In The Matter Of The Estate of Aguida Amires. Supreme Court CNMI. 1996, http://www.cnmilaw.org/pdf/supreme/1997-MP-08.pdf
Taman, Candido B. et al. "A House Commemorative Resolution." 2006. http://cnmileg.gov.mp/documents/house/hse_comres/15/HCR15-17.pdf

"The Insular Empire: America in the Mariana Islands", a one-hour PBS documentary distributed by New Day Films. Directed by Vanessa Warheit. New Day Films, 2010.

Goetzfridt, Nicholas J. "Carolinians on Guam". Guampedia. n.d., https://www.guampedia.com/carolinians-on-guam/ Retrieved on 11 March 2019.
Lirio, Lori Lyn C. "September proclaimed Chamorro and Carolinian Cultural Heritage Month". The Guam Daily Post. 2018, https://www.postguam.com/news/cnmi/september-proclaimed-chamorro-and-carolinian-cultural-heritage-month/article_bc820b5e-aff9-11e8-970b-f3ce9c49a4fc.html Retrieved on 11 March 2019.

Ethnic groups in the Federated States of Micronesia
Ethnic groups in the Northern Mariana Islands
Indigenous peoples of Micronesia
Northern Mariana Islands people of Carolinian descent
Micronesia